Cottonwood may refer to:

Plants
 Celtis conferta subsp. amblyphylla, a tree in the hemp and hackberry family
 Hibiscus tiliaceus,  a flowering shrub or tree in the mallow family
 In the genus Populus, a number of difficult-to-distinguish trees:
 Populus angustifolia (narrowleaf cottonwood), in the Great Basin
 Populus balsamifera (balsam cottonwood), in Canada and parts of northern United States
 Populus heterophylla (swamp cottonwood), in the eastern United States
 Populus trichocarpa (black cottonwood), in the Pacific Northwest of North America
 Populus x jackii (balm-of-Gilead)
 Populus × acuminata, lanceleaf cottonwood,
Populus sect. Aigeiros, a section of three species
 Populus deltoides (eastern cottonwood), in eastern, central, and southwestern United States, and parts of Canada and Mexico
 Populus fremontii (Fremont cottonwood), in the southwestern United States and Mexico
 Populus nigra (black poplar), in Europe, Asia, and Africa

Places
 Cottonwoods, Manitoba, an unincorporated community in Manitoba, Canada

United States
 Cottonwood, Alabama, a town
 Cottonwood, Arizona, a city
 Cottonwood, California, a census-designated place in Shasta County
 Cottonwood, Yolo County, California, a ghost town
 Cottonwood, Colorado, a neighborhood in the town of Parker
 Cottonwood, Georgia, an unincorporated community in the City of Fayetteville, Georgia
 Cottonwood, Idaho, a city
 Cottonwood Falls, Kansas, a city
 Cottonwood, Minnesota, a city
 Cottonwood, Coal County, Oklahoma, an unincorporated community
 Cottonwood, Sequoyah County, Oklahoma, an unincorporated community
 Cottonwood, South Dakota, a town
 Cottonwood, Callahan County, Texas, an unincorporated community
 Cottonwood, Kaufman County, Texas, a city
 Cottonwood West, Utah, an unincorporated area in Salt Lake County that has since become part of the cities of Holladay and Murray
 Cottonwood Heights, Utah, a city south of Cottonwood West
 Alamo, Texas, a city in Texas, US, the name of which means "Cottonwood tree" in Spanish/Mexican

People
 Eli Cottonwood, ring name of professional wrestler Kipp Christianson formerly from WWE's NXT
 Joe Cottonwood (born 1947), American author of fiction and poetry

Other uses
 Cottonwood Limestone, a geologic member of limestone in Nebraska, Kansas, and Oklahoma
 Cottonwood (EP), a 2019 EP by NLE Choppa

See also
 Cottonwood Island (disambiguation)
 Cottonwood Lake (disambiguation)
 Cottonwood River (disambiguation)
 Cottonwood Township (disambiguation)
 Cotton tree (disambiguation)